The 35th Biathlon World Championships were held for the second time in Oslo, Norway from 19 February to 26 February 2000. Due to fog, the men's relay was moved to Lahti, Finland on March 11.

Men's results

20 km individual

 Date / Start Time: Wed February 23, 2000 / 13:00 CET

10 km sprint

 Date / Start Time: Sat February 19, 2000 / 13:00 CET

12.5 km pursuit

 Date / Start Time: Sun February 20, 2000 / 13:00 CET

15 km mass start

 Date / Start Time: Sat February 26, 2000 / 11:00 CET

4 × 7.5 km relay

 Date / Start Time: Sat March 11, 2000 / 14:00 CET

Women's results

15 km individual

 Date / Start Time: Tue February 22, 2000 / 13:00 CET

7.5 km sprint

 Date / Start Time: Sat February 19, 2000 / 10:30 CET

10 km pursuit

 Date / Start Time: Sun February 20, 2000 / 10:30 CET

12.5 km mass start

 Date / Start Time: Sat February 26, 2000 / 13:00 CET

4 × 7.5 km relay

 Date / Start Time: Fri February 25, 2000 / 13:00 CET

Medal table

References

2000
Biathlon World Championships
2000 in Norwegian sport
International sports competitions in Oslo
International sports competitions hosted by Finland
2000 in Finnish sport
2000s in Oslo
Biathlon competitions in Finland
Biathlon competitions in Norway
Sports competitions in Lahti
Holmenkollen
February 2000 sports events in Europe